Michael Carabello (born November 18, 1947) is an American musician, best known for playing percussion with Santana during that band's early years. He is a member of the Rock and Roll Hall of Fame.

Career
Carabello was born in San Francisco and has Puerto Rican ancestry; he grew up in the city's Mission District. He joined Santana in 1968 shortly before the band signed with Columbia Records, and primarily played congas for the band while occasionally playing piano. He appeared on the albums Santana, Abraxas, and Santana III, all of which were internationally successful, and he is also depicted with the band in the Woodstock film. He co-wrote several songs on those albums, and is the sole writer for the percussion-oriented track "Singing Winds, Crying Beasts" on Abraxas.

Carabello left Santana in 1971. He formed the short-lived jazz band Cobra in 1975, and then settled into a career of teaching and art. In 1998 Carabello was inducted into the Rock and Roll Hall of Fame as a member of Santana. He is the only member of the Hall of Fame whose primary instrument is congas. He appeared on Tattoo You by The Rolling Stones in 1981. In 2016 Carabello participated in a reunion of the classic-era Santana lineup for the album Santana IV. It was the first time he had recorded with Carlos Santana and some other former bandmates in 45 years.

References

External links 
Mike Carabello on Allmusic

Michael Carabello discography at Discogs

Living people
Santana (band) members
1947 births
American percussionists
American people of Puerto Rican descent